Tetsuzan Kuroda (born 1950 in Japan) is a martial artist. He was a featured participant in the Aiki Expo (2003), and is regarded as one of Japan's greatest swordsmen.

Kuroda Tetsuzan, sensei of the Shinbukan Kuroda Dojo, is the Soke of several ancient Samurai military disciplines. Kuroda sensei inherited this knowledge through his family line, and is the headmaster of the Kuroda family martial legacy. The arts that he has inherited include:

 Komagawa Kaishin-ryū kenjutsu
 Shishin-Takuma-ryū jujutsu
 Tamiya-ryū iaijutsu
 Tsubaki-Kotengu ryu bojutsu
 Seigyoku-Ogurirryi Sakkatsujutsu

References

Japanese swordfighters
Living people
1950 births